Bahrami may refer to:

People
 Bahrami (surname)

Places
 Abbasabad-e Bahrami, Rigan County, Kerman Province, Iran
 Bahrami, Khorramabad County,  Lorestan Province, Iran
 Bahrami-ye Olya, Jiroft County, Kerman Province, Iran
 Bahrami-ye Sofla, Jiroft County, Kerman Province, Iran
 Kohneh Bahrami, Izeh County, Khuzestan Province, Iran
 Mahmudiyeh-ye Bahrami, Rafsanjan County, Kerman Province, Iran
 Shah Bahrami, Kavar County, Fars Province, Iran